Clint Myers is a retired college softball and college baseball coach, who previously served as head coach of the Arizona State Sun Devils softball team and the Auburn Tigers softball team.  In 12 seasons coaching softball, he won a pair of Women's College World Series championships and appeared in seven others.

His tenure at Auburn ended amid allegations of pursuing inappropriate relationships with students.

Head coaching record
Softball, Division I

References

Living people
Arizona State Sun Devils baseball coaches
Arizona State Sun Devils baseball players
Arizona State Sun Devils softball coaches
Auburn Tigers softball coaches
Central Arizona Vaqueros baseball coaches
Central Arizona Vaqueros softball coaches
Eastern Washington Eagles baseball coaches
High school baseball coaches in the United States
Yavapai Roughriders baseball coaches
Year of birth missing (living people)